Eknath (IAST: Eka-nātha, Marathi pronunciation: [eknath]) (8 november 1533–1599), commonly known as Sant Eknath was an Indian Hindu saint, philosopher and poet. He was a devotee of the Hindu deity Vitthal and is a major figure of the Warkari movement. Eknath is often viewed as a spiritual successor to the prominent Marathi saints Dnyaneshwar and Namdev.

Biography
Precise details of his life remain obscure. It is generally believed that Eknath lived during the latter three-quarters of the 16th-century. He was born into a Deshastha Rigvedi Brahmin family of Vishwamitra gotra to Suryanarayan and Rukminibai at Paithan, present-day Maharashtra and was a follower of the Ashvalayana Sutra. His father probably held the title of Kulkarni and kept financial accounts. Their family deity is Ekvira Devi (or Renuka). 

His parents died while Eknath was young. He was then raised by his grandfather, Chakrapani. His great-grandfather Bhanudas was another revered saint of the Warkari sect. Eknath was a disciple of Janardan Swami who was a devotee of the Hindu deity Dattatreya.

Eknath's samadhi shrine is located at Paithan near the Godavari river. Celebrations commemorating Eknath are held every year around the month of March at Paithan.

Literary contribution

Eknath's writings include a variation of the Hindu religious text Bhagavata Purana, known as Eknathi Bhagavata.  He also wrote a variation of the Hindu epic Ramayana, known as Bhavarth Ramayan. He also composed Rukmini Swayamwar Hastamalak, a literary piece consisting of 764 owee (poetic metre) and based on a Sanskrit hymn of the same name.

His other literary works include Shukashtak (447 owee), https://shikshaved.com/category/marathi-essay/-Sukha (510 owee), Ananda-Lahari (154 owee),  Chiranjeewa-Pad (42 owee), Geeta-Saar and Prahlad-Vijaya.  He introduced a new form of devotional melodies called Bharood and wrote nearly 300 of them.

See also

Vasudeva
Bhagavatism

References
Citations

Bibliography

External links
 Sant Eknath Maharaj Information in Marathi

Eknath - A Translation from Bhaktalilamrita by Justin E. Abbott (1927) at archive.org
Shri Eknathi Bhagwat (Marathi) at archive.org

Marathi-language writers
Marathi-language poets
Warkari
16th-century Hindu philosophers and theologians
Bhakti movement
16th-century Indian philosophers
Sant Mat
Date of birth unknown
Date of death unknown
People from Marathwada
Marathi Hindu saints
Scholars from Maharashtra
1533 births
Brahmins who fought against discrimination
Anti-caste activists